Kowalin  is a village in the administrative district of Gmina Kraśnik, within Kraśnik County, Lublin Voivodeship, in eastern Poland.

The village has an approximate population of 320.

References

Kowalin